Gabino Zavala (born September 7, 1951) is a Mexican-born, former American prelate of the Roman Catholic Church.  Zavala served as an auxiliary bishop of the Archdiocese of Los Angeles from 1994 until 2012.  Zavala resigned at the request of Pope Benedict XVI after admitting he was the father of two children.

Biography

Early life

Born September 7, 1951, in Guerrero, Mexico, Gabino Zavala and his family moved to Tijuana, Mexico when he was a child. He survived a fire in his family's apartment that killed two of his brothers. The family then moved to East Los Angeles, California. In 1969, Zavala entered St. John's Seminary College in Camarillo, California.

Priesthood 

Zavala was ordained a priest for the Archdiocese of Los Angeles at St. Vibiana's Cathedral in Los Angeles on May 28, 1977, by Cardinal Timothy Manning.  After his ordination, Zavala served as an associate pastor of Our Lady of Guadalupe Parish in East Los Angeles, associate director of the marriage tribunal for the Archdiocese of Los Angeles.

After earning a Licentiate of Canon Law from Catholic University of America School of Canon Law in Washington, D.C.  Zavala became a professor of canon law and the rector of St. John's Seminary.

Auxiliary Bishop of Los Angeles

Pope John Paul II appointed Zavala as auxiliary bishop of the Archdiocese of Los Angeles and titular bishop of Tamascani on February 8, 1994,  He received his episcopal consecration from Cardinal Roger Mahony on March 19, 1994. Zavala served as the auxiliary bishop and episcopal vicar of the San Gabriel Pastoral Region until his resignation. Zavala promoted restorative justice, opposed the death penalty, and was a long-time supporter of immigration reform. Although he was sometimes considered orthodox in his beliefs, he had a long history of supporting controversial positions on LGBT rights.

Zavala was involved with a number of organizations: he was the bishop president of the U.S. section of Pax Christi, co-president of Interfaith Worker Justice, and the episcopal advisor to the International Commission of Catholic Prison Pastoral Care (ICCPPC). He was also an adjunct professor of canon law and pastoral theology at Loyola Marymount University in Los Angeles.  In 2000, Zavala organized Encuentro, a conference of Catholics from different backgrounds and cultures. Encuentro had over 5,000 attendees, including 40 bishops and Cardinal Bernard Law.

Zavala was honored in 2004 by the group Death Penalty Focus for his efforts to bring restorative justice reforms to the criminal justice system and to abolish the death penalty. He got involved in prison ministry and would bring parishioners on visits to local prisons.  In May 2011, Zavala was recognized as a 'giant of justice' by Clergy & Laity United for Economic Justice (CLUE) .  In June 2011, he wrote an editorial for the National Catholic Reporter about an “unprecedented assault on workers’ rights now spreading across the country".

Resignation and legacy

On January 4, 2012, Archbishop José Gómez announced that Pope Benedict XVI had accepted Zavala's resignation as auxiliary bishop of Los Angeles.  In December 2011, Zavala disclosed to Gómez that he was the father of two teenage children. The pope accepted Zavala's resignation under Code of Canon Law c. 401 §2. In his announcement, Gómez stated that Zavala had not been in ministry since the revelation, and that he "will be living privately". 

Gómez also said that the unidentified children were minors living with their mother in another state, and that the archdiocese would assist them with college costs. Though not specified,  the Los Angeles Times revealed that Zavala's relationship with the children's mother was "more than a passing relationship."

See also

 

 Catholic Church hierarchy
 Catholic Church in the United States
 Historical list of the Catholic bishops of the United States
 List of Catholic bishops of the United States
 Lists of patriarchs, archbishops, and bishops

References

External links

Roman Catholic Archdiocese of Los Angeles Official Site

Episcopal succession

1951 births
Living people
20th-century Roman Catholic bishops in the United States
Loyola Marymount University faculty
Mexican emigrants to the United States
Mexican people of Basque descent
People from Tijuana
Catholic University of America School of Canon Law alumni
21st-century Roman Catholic bishops in the United States
People from Guerrero
People from East Los Angeles, California